Colm Joseph Feore  (born August 22, 1958) is a Canadian actor. A 15-year veteran of the Stratford Festival, he is known for his Gemini-winning turn as Prime Minister Pierre Trudeau in the CBC miniseries Trudeau (2002), his portrayal of Glenn Gould in Thirty Two Short Films About Glenn Gould (1993), and for playing Detective Martin Ward in Bon Cop, Bad Cop (2006) and its 2017 sequel.

His other roles include Martin Harrison in Chicago (2002), Lord Marshal Zhylaw in The Chronicles of Riddick (2004), First Gentleman Henry Taylor on 24 (2009), Cardinal Della Rovere on The Borgias (2011–2013), Laufey in Thor (2011), General Ted Brockhart on House of Cards (2016–2017), Declan Gallard on 21 Thunder (2017), Wernher von Braun in For All Mankind (2019), and Sir Reginald Hargreeves on The Umbrella Academy (2019–present). Feore is also a Prix Iris and Screen Actors Guild Award winner and a Genie Award nominee.

Early life and education
Feore was born on August 22, 1958, in Boston, Massachusetts. His parents were Irish immigrants, and the family moved back to Ireland shortly after Colm was born, remaining there for several years before immigrating to Windsor, Ontario. After graduating from Ridley College in St. Catharines, Ontario, he attended the National Theatre School of Canada in Montreal, Quebec.

Career
Feore honed his acting skills as a member of the Acting Company of the Stratford Festival of Canada, North America's largest classical repertory theatre. He spent 17 seasons at Stratford where he rose from bit parts to leading roles, including Romeo, Hamlet, Richard III, and Cyrano. He returned in 2006 to star in four productions, including Don Juan in both English and French and as Fagin in Oliver! More recently, in 2009 he played the main role of Macbeth in the play Macbeth, the main role of Cyrano in Cyrano de Bergerac, and Lear in King Lear in 2014, all performed at the Stratford Festival Theatre. He also has appeared on Broadway as Cassius in the production of Julius Caesar starring Denzel Washington as Brutus. Off-Broadway, for the Public Theater, he was Claudius in a Hamlet production that starred Liev Schreiber.

In Canada, Feore's most famous roles were as Prime Minister Pierre Trudeau in the critically acclaimed television mini-series Trudeau, a role for which he won a Gemini Award for Best Performance by an Actor in a Leading Role in a Dramatic Program or Mini-Series, as classical pianist Glenn Gould in the 1993 film Thirty-Two Short Films About Glenn Gould, and as by-the-book English Canadian detective Martin Ward in the box-office hit Bon Cop, Bad Cop. He also played a crazed marketing executive imposter in the second season of the Canadian TV series, Slings and Arrows, a role that continued for several episodes. The show has run in the United States on the Sundance Channel.

Outside Canada, Feore has appeared in numerous film, theatre and television roles.  He is perhaps most famous in the United States for his supporting roles in such Hollywood films as Pearl Harbor, The Sum of All Fears, Paycheck, and The Chronicles of Riddick. In 1999, he appeared in Stephen King's Storm of the Century as the powerful ancient wizard Andre Linoge. He was the crooked Los Angeles Police Chief James E. Davis in 2008's Changeling.  In 2011, he appeared as Laufey, King of the Frost Giants, in the live-action superhero film Thor. In 2014, he portrayed Dr. Francis Dulmacher in Gotham.  He portrayed the First Gentleman Henry Taylor on the seventh season of 24, appeared as Tad Whitney in The West Wing second-season episode titled "Galileo" and played the billionaire suspect Jordan Hayes in the 2011 Law & Order: Special Victims Unit episode "Flight". He played supernatural murderers in two episodes of Friday the 13th: The Series.

Honours
On June 8, 2002, Feore received an honorary Doctor of Humanities degree (D.Hum.) from the University of Windsor in Windsor. In October 2012, he was awarded an honorary Doctor of Letters degree (D.Litt.) by Wilfrid Laurier University in Waterloo, Ontario, in recognition of his contributions to Canadian theatre and film.

Feore was honoured with Gascon-Thomas Award from the National Theatre School of Canada in 2013, the award is given annually to an actor that makes an exceptional contribution to the growth of theatre. In the same year, he was made an Officer of the Order of Canada (OC) "for his contributions as an actor of the stage and screen, notably by bridging Anglophone and Francophone cultures as a fluently bilingual performer."

In 2019, Feore received the Lifetime Artistic Achievement Award in Film from the Governor General's Performing Arts Awards. He won the Canadian Screen Award for Best Supporting Actor at the 9th Canadian Screen Awards in 2021, for the film Sugar Daddy.

Personal life
Feore has been married to Donna Feore (née Starnes), a choreographer and theatre director associated with the National Arts Centre and the Stratford Festival, since 1994. He was previously married to actress Sidonie Boll, whom he met at the National Theatre School, from 1983 to 1994. Feore has three children: son Jack with Boll, and son Thomas and daughter Anna with Donna Feore.

Feore is fluent in French.

Filmography

Film

Television

Stratford Festival Theatre credits
 Romeo and Juliet (1984), Romeo
 The Boys from Syracuse (1986), Antipholus
 Cymbeline (1986), Iachimo
 Othello (1987), Iago
 Richard III (1988), King Richard III
 The Taming of the Shrew (1988), Petruchio
 The Three Musketeers (1988), Athos
 Julius Caesar (1990), Cassius
The Merry Wives of Windsor (1990), Frank Ford
 Hamlet (1991), Hamlet
 Romeo and Juliet (1992), Mercutio
 Measure for Measure (1992), Angelo
 A Midsummer Night's Dream (1993), Oberon
 The Pirates of Penzance (1994), Pirate King
 Cyrano de Bergerac (1994), Cyrano
 My Fair Lady (2002), Henry Higgins
 Don Juan (2006), Don Juan
 Oliver! (2006), Fagin
 Coriolanus (2006), Coriolanus
 Intervention (2007)
 Macbeth (2009), Macbeth
 Cyrano de Bergerac (2009), Cyrano
 King Lear (2014), King Lear
 The Beaux' Stratagem (2014), Archer
 Richard III (2022), Richard III
 The Miser (2022), Harper

References

External links

 Canadian Film Encyclopedia. A publication of The Film Reference Library/a division of the Toronto International Film Festival Group
 
 
 

1958 births
American emigrants to Canada
Canadian male film actors
Canadian male stage actors
Canadian male television actors
Canadian male voice actors
Canadian Screen Award winners
Canadian people of Irish descent
Living people
Male actors from Boston
Male actors from Windsor, Ontario
Officers of the Order of Canada
Outstanding Performance by a Cast in a Motion Picture Screen Actors Guild Award winners
National Theatre School of Canada alumni
20th-century Canadian male actors
21st-century Canadian male actors
Canadian male Shakespearean actors
Best Supporting Actor Genie and Canadian Screen Award winners
Ridley College alumni
Best Supporting Actor Jutra and Iris Award winners